Local elections were held in Parañaque City on May 13, 2010 within the Philippine general election. The voters elected for the elective local posts in the city: the mayor, vice mayor, the congressman, and the councilors, eight of them in the two districts of the city.

Background 
Mayor Florencio "Jun" Bernabe Jr. ran for third and final term. He was challenged by former Mayor Joselito "Joey" Marquez and Rep. Eduardo Zialcita.

Vice Mayor Gustavo Tambunting ran for second term. He was challenged by former Vice Mayor Andres Jose "Anjo" Yllana.

First District Representative Eduardo Zialcita was term-limited. He ran as Mayor. His place will be contested by former Laguna Vice Governor Edwin Olivarez, son of former Mayor Pablo Olivarez; Rolando Bernabe; brother of Mayor Florencio Bernabe Jr., Epimaco "Junjun" Densing III, Edison "Ed"Javier, Fortunata "Naty" Magsombol, and Deldin "Ding" Wenceslao Jr.

Second District Representative Roilo Golez ran for third and final term. He was challenged by Pedro "Pete" Montano.

Results 
Names written in bold-Italic are the re-elected incumbents while in italic are incumbents lost in elections.

For District Representative

First District 
Rep. Eduardo Zialcita was on his third consecutive term already and ineligible for reelection; the Nacionalista Party had no nominee for this district. Former Laguna Vice Governor Edwin Olivarez defeated Rolando Bernabe.

Second District 
Rep. Roilo Golez won the election.

For Mayor 
Mayor Florencio "Jun" Bernabe Jr. won in a tight election between Former Mayor Joselito "Joey" Marquez and First District Rep. Eduardo Zialcita.

For Vice Mayor 
Vice Mayor Gustavo Tambunting defeated Former Vice Mayor Andres Jose "Anjo" Yllana.

For Councilors

First District

|-bgcolor=black
|colspan=5|

Second District

|-bgcolor=black
|colspan=5|

References

Parañaque
2010
2010 elections in Metro Manila